The Yellow Handkerchief is a 2008 American independent drama film. The film is a remake of the 1977 Japanese classic of the same name The Yellow Handkerchief (幸福の黄色いハンカチ Shiawase no kiiroi hankachi, lit. The yellow handkerchief of happiness) directed by Yoji Yamada.

Set in the present-day American South, The Yellow Handkerchief stars William Hurt as Brett Hanson, an ex-convict who embarks on a road trip straight out of prison. Hanson hitches a ride with two troubled teens, Martine (Kristen Stewart) and Gordy (Eddie Redmayne), traversing post-Hurricane Katrina Louisiana in an attempt to reach his ex-wife and long-lost love, May (Maria Bello). Along the way, the three reflect on their existence, struggle for acceptance, and find their way not only through Louisiana, but through life. Directed by Udayan Prasad and produced by Arthur Cohn, the film was shown at Sundance in 2008 and given a limited release on February 26, 2010, by Samuel Goldwyn Films.

Plot 
After being released from prison after six years, ex-convict Brett Hanson becomes lost in a new and unfamiliar world of freedoms and responsibilities. Struggling to reconcile himself with his disastrous past, he embarks on a journey to his home of south Louisiana to reunite with the ex-wife he left behind, May. Along this journey, he meets two teenagers: Martine, a troubled 15-year-old who has just escaped her family, and Gordy, a geeky outcast desperately seeking acceptance. Martine and Gordy offer to give Brett a lift home, and on the ensuing road trip the three reflect on their own personal misfit status while discovering in themselves and each other the acceptance each so deeply desires. Brett weighs whether to start a new life or rekindle his love with May – he's not sure she'll take him back – while Martine reevaluates her relationships with boys and her family and Gordy struggles with his affection for Martine.

Cast 
 William Hurt as Brett Hanson
 Kristen Stewart as Martine
 Maria Bello as May
 Eddie Redmayne as Gordy
 Kaori Momoi as Motel Owner 
 Ashlynn Ross as Deliver Girl

Production 
The film is a remake of the 1977 film The Yellow Handkerchief, which in turn is loosely based on a story by Pete Hamill that appeared in the New York Post in 1971. Director and writer Terry George, a friend of Hamill's, initially wrote an early draft for a remake, which was then planned to be directed by Jim Sheridan.

In 2003, producer Arthur Cohn obtained the remake rights for The Yellow Handkerchief from Japanese studio Shochiku. 

Principal photography for the film took place in February 2007 in Louisiana.

William Hurt prepared for his role by spending four days at Louisiana State Penitentiary at Angola, including a rare overnight for a volunteer in a maximum-security cell. In an interview, he said he'd also done "charitable work... periodically visit[ing] the prisons in Rockland County in New York State to take a program of hope and self-rehabilitation to the prisoners."

Release 
The film originally premiered at the 2008 Sundance Film Festival in the Premieres section. It was later given a one-week theatrical release at the end of the year in order to qualify for the Academy Awards. 

Samuel Goldwyn Films acquired the film's distribution rights in 2009 but decided to hold the film from release in order to capitalize on Kristen Stewart's rising fame from the Twilight film series.

The film opened in limited release on February 26, 2010.

Box office 
The film grossed $318,623 in 29 theaters in the United States.

Reception

Critical response 
The Yellow Handkerchief holds a 65% favorable rating on Rotten Tomatoes based on 51 reviews. The site's critics consensus reads, "Small and intimate -- occasionally to a fault -- The Yellow Handkerchief rises above its overly familiar ingredients thanks to riveting performances from William Hurt and Kristen Stewart." On Metacritic, the film has a weighted average score of 64 out of 100.<ref name="Metacritic">{{cite web |url=https://www.metacritic.com/film/titles/yellowhandkerchief |title=The Yellow Handkerchief (2010) |work=Metacritic |publisher=CBS Interactive |accessdate=March 22, 2010}}</ref>

In his review for the New York Post, Lou Lumenick gave the film 3.5 stars out of 4 and praised the acting of the cast, especially William Hurt. Lumenick wrote, "Stories about people yearning for second chances in life have a way of turning schmaltzy in American movies. In other hands, this movie could very easily have been the cinematic equivalent of the old Tony Orlando song, 'Tie a Yellow Ribbon ‘Round the Ole Oak Tree.' But Erin Dignam’s episodic script, brimming with humor and honest emotion — and the pitch-perfect direction of Udayan Prasad (My Son the Fanatic'') thankfully avoids manipulating the audience at every turn."

References

External links 
 
 
 
 

2008 films
2008 independent films
2008 romantic drama films
American independent films
American remakes of Japanese films
American drama road movies
American romantic drama films
American teen drama films
American teen romance films
2000s English-language films
Films set in New Orleans
Films directed by Udayan Prasad
2000s American films